Eduardo Decena (14 January 1926 – 1 November 2002) was a Filipino basketball player who competed in the 1948 Summer Olympics.

References

External links
 

1926 births
2002 deaths
Basketball players from Manila
Olympic basketball players of the Philippines
Basketball players at the 1948 Summer Olympics
Philippines men's national basketball team players
Filipino men's basketball players
Place of birth missing
De La Salle Green Archers basketball players